Stradbally GAA is a Gaelic football club in Stradbally, County Laois, Ireland.

The club was founded in 1889 and its colours are green and white. The club grounds are called Bill Delaney Park after one of the club's most famous sons.

Stradbally GAA Club has won 17 Laois Senior Football Championship titles and numerous other titles at junior, intermediate and underage grades.

After 18 years in existence the championship of 1905 was won when the team defeated Raheenabrogue by 1-4 to 0-3 at Portlaoise on 21 January 1906. 2016 Stradbally bet Portlaoise in the county championship final and stopped their 10 in a row with a last minute goal.

Sean Delaney, Karl Lenihan, Tony Maher, Colm Kelly, Damien Delaney, Colm Begley, Greg Ramsbottom, Paul Begley and Gary Kavanagh are among Stradbally's most famous players in recent times.

Achievements
 Laois Senior Football Championship Winners 1905, 1908, 1911, 1928, 1929, 1930, 1932, 1933, 1934, 1936, 1937, 1940, 1941, 1997, 1998, 2005, 2016
 Laois Intermediate Football Championship (1) 1959
 Laois All-County Football League Div. 1: 1999
 Laois All-County Football League Div. 2: (3) 1982, 1983, 2008
 Laois All-County Football League Div. 3: (1) 2000
 Laois All-County Football League Div. 4: (1) 1999

Notable players
 Sean Delaney
 Karl Lenihan
 Tony Maher
 Colm Kelly
 Greg Ramsbottom
 Colm Begley
 Paul Begley
 Gary Kavanagh
Jody Dillon
Eoin Buggie
Tom Shiel, who came off the bench against Clare to kick a point in an All-Ireland Qualifier win when he was 17 years, one of Laois's youngest SFC debutants.
Gary Comerford

References

Gaelic games clubs in County Laois
Gaelic football clubs in County Laois
Stradbally